The Queen Sirikit Cup, officially the Asia-Pacific Amateur Ladies Golf Team Championship, is an annual amateur team golf championship for women organised by the Asia-Pacific Golf Confederation. The inaugural event was held in 1979. The event is named after Queen Sirikit of Thailand.

Format
Teams consist of three players. The tournament is held over 4 days with 18 holes of stroke play on each day, the best two rounds counting for the team score. Up to 2019 the event was held over 3 rounds.

Team results

Source:

Individual resultsSource:

Teams

The following teams have competed:

Australia
Australia did not compete in 1979 or 2023.

1980 Jane Crafter, Jane Lock, Sue Tonkin
1981 Lindy Goggin, Jane Lock, Sue Tonkin
1982 Lindy Goggin, Dennise Hutton, Edwina Kennedy
1983 Louise Briers, Corinne Dibnah, Edwina Kennedy
1984 Corinne Dibnah, Edwina Kennedy, Sandra McCaw
1985 Louise Briers, Sandra McCaw, Sue Tonkin
1986 Helen Greenwood, Edwina Kennedy, Sandra McCaw
1987 Louise Briers, Edwina Kennedy, Ericka Maxwell
1988 Liz Cavill, Nicole Lowien, Mardi Lunn
1989 Louise Briers, Liz Cavill, Helen Kight
1990 Wendy Doolan, Sarah Gautrey, Jane Shearwood
1991 Louise Briers, Wendy Doolan, Jane Shearwood
1992 Anne-Marie Knight, Loraine Lambert, Karrie Webb
1993 Ericka Jayatilaka, Joanne Mills, Karrie Webb
1994 Anne-Marie Knight, Karrie Webb, Simone Williams
1995 Tanya Holl, Terri McKinnon, Alison Wheelhouse
1996 Stacey Doggett, Kate MacIntosh, Simone Williams
1997 Tamie Durdin, Kate MacIntosh, Simone Williams
1998 Adele Bannerman, Michelle Ellis, Kate MacIntosh
1999 Sandy Grimshaw, Natalie Parkinson, Rebecca Stevenson
2000 Helen Beatty, Rebecca Stevenson, Nadina Taylor
2001 Helen Beatty, Rebecca Stevenson, Nadina Taylor
2002 Nikki Campbell, Rebecca Coakley, Vicky Uwland
2003 Melanie Holmes-Smith, Katy Jarochowicz, Sarah Kemp
2004 Sarah Kemp, Sarah-Jane Kenyon, Dana Lacey
2005 Emma Bennett, Nikki Garrett, Sarah Kemp
2006 Emma Bennett, Sunny Park, Anna Parsons
2007 Emma Bennett, Stephanie Na, Kristie Smith
2008 Clare Choi, Stephanie Na, Kristie Smith
2009 Julia Boland, Rebecca Flood, Stacey Keating
2010 Ebony Heard, Stacey Keating, Justine Lee
2011 Breanna Elliott, Ashley Ona, Jessica Speechly
2012 Breanna Elliott, Whitney Hillier, Oh Su-hyun
2013 Minjee Lee, Grace Lennon, Oh Su-hyun
2014 Hannah Green, Cathleen Santoso, Shelley Shin
2015 Elizabeth Elmassian, Hannah Green, Rebecca Kay
2016 Robyn Choi, Karis Davidson, Hannah Green
2017 Karis Davidson, Alizza Hetherington, Rebecca Kay
2018 Stephanie Bunque, Rebecca Kay, Grace Kim
2019 Doey Choi, Steph Kyriacou, Julienne Soo
2022 Kelsey Bennett, Caitlin Peirce, Kirsten Rudgeley

New Zealand
New Zealand did not compete until 1984.

1984 Janice Arnold, Brenda Rhodes, Jan Scandrett
1985 Janice Arnold, Jan Scandrett, Debbie Smith
1986 Liz Douglas, Karrin Duckworth, Marnie McGuire
1987 Tracey Hanson, Brenda Ormsby, Debbie Smith
1988 Jan Cooke, Tracey Hanson, Ingrid Van Steenbergen
1989 Tracey Hanson, Sheree Higgens, Jan Higgins
1990 Lisa Aldridge, Jan Higgins, Annette Stott
1991 Lisa Aldridge, Jan Higgins, Marnie McGuire
1992 Lisa Aldridge, Susan Farron, Annette Stott
1993 Lisa Aldridge, Lynnette Brooky, Susan Farron
1994 Lynnette Brooky, Susan Farron, Gina Scott
1995 Catherine Knight, Gina Scott, Kerryn Starr
1996 Renee Fowler, Catherine Knight, Gina Scott
1997 Renee Fowler, Catherine Knight, Brenda Ormsby
1998 Renee Fowler, Tina Howard, Brenda Ormsby
1999 Lisa Aldridge, Renee Fowler, Tina Howard
2000 Chun Hee-jeong, Claire Dury, Wendy Hawkes
2001 Anita Boon, Chun Hee-jeong, Tina Howard
2002 Anita Boon, Tina Howard, Brenda Ormsby
2003 Enu Chung, Tina Howard, Penny Newbrook
2004 Enu Chung, Penny Newbrook, Sarah Nicholson
2005 Sharon Ahn, Natasha Krishna, Sarah Nicholson
2006 Sharon Ahn, Natasha Krishna, Sarah Nicholson
2007 Natasha Krishna, Dasom Lee, Penny Newbrook
2008 Cathryn Bristow, Tammy Clelland, Dana Kim
2009 Zoe Brake, Larissa Eruera, Emily Perry
2010 Zoe Brake, Cecilia Cho, Lydia Ko
2011 Cecilia Cho, Lydia Ko, Emily Perry
2012 Chantelle Cassidy, Lydia Ko, Emily Perry
2013 Julianne Alvarez, Lita Guo, Munchin Keh
2014 Julianne Alvarez, Munchin Keh, Wenyung Keh
2015 Julianne Alvarez, Munchin Keh, Wenyung Keh
2016 Alanna Campbell, Chantelle Cassidy, Munchin Keh
2017 Alanna Campbell, Amelia Garvey, Rose Zheng
2018 Brittney Dryland, Juliana Hung, Caryn Khoo
2019 Juliana Hung, Carmen Lim, Vivian Lu
2022 Eunseo Choi, Vivian Lu, Fiona Xu
2023 Eunseo Choi, Vivian Lu, Fiona Xu

South Korea
South Korea did not compete from 1980 to 1986.

1979 Cho Dong-sun, Kim Myung-sun, Park Bong-sum
1987 Lee Eun-hwa, Won Jae-sook, Yeum Sung-mi
1988 Lee Jong-im, Won Jae-sook, Yeum Sung-mi
1989 Lee Jong-im, Won Jae-sook, Yeum Sung-mi
1990 Lee Jong-im, Shin So-ra, Won Jae-sook
1991 Chung Il-mi, Shin So-ra, Won Jae-sook
1992 Kwon Oh-yun, Song Chae-eun, Suh Ah-ram
1993 Pak Se-ri, Suh Ji-hyun, Yeum Sung-mi
1994 Han Hee-won, Pak Se-ri, Song Chae-eun
1995 Han Hee-won, Kang Yoo-yun, Kim Mi-hyun
1996 Han Hee-won, Park Na-mee, Song Eun-jin
1997 Han Hee-won, Kim Kyung-sook, Park So-young
1998 Cho Kyung-hee, Jeong Jang, Kim Kyung-sook
1999 Cho Kyung-hee, Kim Joo-yun, Oh Mi-sun
2000 Cho Rynng-ah, Kim Joo-yun, Lim Sun-wook
2001 Ahn Shi-hyun, Kim Joo-mi, Kim So-hee
2002 Kim Joo-mi, Lim Sung-ah, Moon Hyun-hee
2003 Park Hee-young, Song Bo-bae, Woo Ji-yun
2004 Choo Ji-young, Chung Da-sol, Park Hee-young
2005 Choo Ji-young, Chung Da-sol, Park Hee-young
2006 Choi He-yong, Hur Mi-jung, Ryu So-yeon
2007 Choi He-yong, Kim Sei-young, Ryu So-yeon
2008 Han Jung-eun, Heo Yoon-kyung, Yang Soo-jin
2009 Jang Ha-na, Kim Sei-young, Park Sun-young
2010 Han Jung-eun, Kim Hyo-joo, Kim Ji-hee
2011 Chin In-gee, Kim Hyo-joo, Kim Ji-hee
2012 Baek Kyu-jung, Kim Hyo-joo, Park Chae-yoon
2013 Park Gye-ol, Park Ji-yeon, Yu Go-un
2014 Choi Hye-jin, Lee So-young, Park Gye-ol
2015 Jang Eun-soo, Lee Joung-eun, Park Hyun-kyung
2016 Choi Hye-jin, Lee Ga-young, Park Hyun-kyung
2017 Choi Hye-jin, Lee Ga-young, Lee So-mi
2018 Cho A-yean, Jeong Yun-ji, Lim Hee-jeong
2019 Lee Ye-won, Seo Uh-jin, Sohn Ye-been
2022 Bang Shin-sil, Kim Min-byeol, Lee Ji-hyun
2023 Kim Min-sol, Seo Kyo-rim, Yoo Hyun-jo

References

Amateur golf tournaments
Team golf tournaments
Golf tournaments in Asia
Recurring sporting events established in 1979